Spider Lilies is a 2007 Taiwanese drama film. It is the second feature-length film by director Zero Chou, and stars Rainie Yang and Isabella Leong in the lead roles. Spider Lilies was screened at the 2007 Berlin International Film Festival, where it won the Teddy Award for Best LGBT-related Feature Film. It was released in the United States by Wolfe Video on 6 May 2008.

The theme song "Xiao Mo Li" ("小茉莉"), performed by Rainie Yang, received a Golden Horse Award nomination for Best Original Film Song at the 44th Golden Horse Awards.

Plot 
Jade is a webcam girl, who broadcasts herself nightly on the internet to anonymous users. She seeks a tattoo, which leads her to the studio of tattoo artist Takeko, who also happens to be Jade's childhood crush. Jade becomes entranced by a large tattoo of golden flowers—spider lilies—on Takeko's arm. She wants the same design, but Takeko refuses, telling her that the flowers are cursed.

Takeko's father, who was killed in an earthquake, had the same tattoo on his arm. Her younger brother witnessed the incident and was traumatised by it, left with no memory except for the image of the flowers. Takeko decided to get the same tattoo, in the hope that it would help her brother's recovery.

Nevertheless, Takeko finds herself drawn to Jade, and begins designing a new tattoo for her.

Meanwhile, a young police officer is trying to ambush Jade and the rest of the girls working in the same website. However, he takes to speaking to her, listening to her childhood stories and connecting with her, thereby slowing down the investigation he is supposed to be working on. Eventually he falls in love with her, trying to tell her to get out before it's too late and before she's caught. He blurts out that he loves her, and Jade, mistaking him for Takeko, goes to her.

When one of Takeko's customers gets into a fight and loses his arm, Takeko sends him to the hospital and forgets to pick up her brother. Desperate and frightened, he goes out into the street to look for her, and recovers his memory just before falling down a steep hill.

Takeko finds her brother in the hospital, where he has slipped into a severe coma.  Devastated and guilt-stricken, she sends a farewell message to Jade saying that she will not be able to finish Jade's tattoo.

Later, Jade decides to go online and wait for Takeko. At this time, the policeman finally confesses his true identity to Jade and tells her that she must get offline immediately. She cries, realizing it was not Takeko who had confessed love to her earlier.

Eventually, Takeko's brother awakes from his coma with his memory intact.  Joyful Takeko sends Jade another message apologizing, and saying that she will wait for her in the tattoo shop.  The last image of the film is footage of Jade, coming to meet Takeko.

Cast 
 Rainie Yang as Jade
 Isabella Leong as Takeko
 Ivy Chen as Zhenzhen
 Jay Shih as A-tung
  as Ching, Takeko's brother
 Kris Shie as David
 Michio Hayashida as Sensei Yoshi
 Pai Chih-ying as Young Jade
 Steven Lin as Young Ching
 Jag Huang as Senior investigator B

Soundtrack

References

External links 
 
 Channel NewsAsia article
 

2007 films
Lesbian-related films
2000s Mandarin-language films
2007 romantic drama films
Taiwanese romantic drama films
Taiwanese LGBT-related films
Films directed by Zero Chou
2007 LGBT-related films
LGBT-related romantic drama films